The Aranjuez is a river in Costa Rica that has its source in the mountains and crosses the Guatusos province of Puntarenas. It empties into the Gulf of Nicoya, in the Pacific Ocean. It takes its name from the ancient city of Aranjuez, which existed in the late 16th century. At the mouth of the river was the port of Ribera, in the place now called Pitahaya Vieja.

See also
 List of rivers of Costa Rica

References

Rivers of Costa Rica